Robert Dixon (1780–1815) was an English artist, known for his work in watercolour painting. He was a member of the Norwich School of painters.

Life
The parish records for St Mary Coslany Church, Norwich, show that Robert Dixon was born on 28 September 1780 and was baptised the following week on 8 October. He was trained at the Royal Academy Schools and in his early twenties became a scenery painter for the Theatre Royal in Norwich. He is known to have turned down an offer to work in London with the stage designer William Capon.

In 1803 John Crome and Robert Ladbrooke formed the Norwich Society of Artists, a group that also included Dixon, Charles Hodgson, Daniel Coppin, James Stark and George Vincent. Their first exhibition, in 1805, marked the start of the Norwich School of painters, the first art movement created outside London. He contributed with the Norwich Society of Artists from 1805, but poor health forced to resign his membership from the Society in 1812. He died in 1815, aged 35.

Notes

References

Bibliography

External links
Works by Robert Dixon in the Norfolk Museums Collections

19th-century English painters
English male painters
1780 births
1815 deaths
People from Norfolk
19th-century English male artists